Mertensia is a genus of flowering plants in the family Boraginaceae. They are perennial herbaceous plants with blue or sometimes white flowers that open from pink-tinged buds. Such a change in flower color is common in Boraginaceae and is caused by an increase of pH in the flower tissue. Mertensia is one of several plants that are commonly called "bluebell". In spite of their common name, the flowers are usually salverform (trumpet-shaped) rather than campanulate (bell-shaped).

Mertensia is native to most of North America and to a large part of Asia from western China to northeastern Russia. Its center of diversity is in the Rocky Mountains. Mertensia is mostly restricted to alpine, subalpine, and montane habitats. Notable exceptions are Mertensia maritima, a maritime plant of Arctic and subarctic coastlines, and Mertensia virginica, which is found from the Appalachian Mountains west to Minnesota, Iowa, and Missouri. Most of the species are endemic to very small areas of the Rocky Mountains.

Mertensia virginica has the largest flowers in the genus and is commonly cultivated. It is sparingly naturalized in Europe. About 12 other species are known in cultivation. The Inuit ate the rhizomes of Mertensia maritima.

Many of the species of Mertensia are hard to distinguish and some are possibly cryptic. Around 150 species names have been published in Mertensia. Most authors have recognized about 45 species, but in 2014, the authors of a molecular phylogenetic study recommended the acceptance of at least 62.

Species 
Author citations are from Tropicos or the International Plant Names Index.

Classification 
Mertensia is a member of the tribe Cynoglosseae. Its closest relative is the monotypic Eurasian genus Asperugo. These two are probably close to Anoplocaryum, a genus of Central Asia and Siberia. The relationships of Anoplocaryum have never been investigated by cladistic analysis of DNA sequences.

Taxonomy 
The type species for Mertensia is M. virginica. Mertensia is divided into two sections: Stenhammaria and Mertensia. Section Stenhammaria consists of the circumboreal M. maritima and 11 of the 12 species from Asia.

The Central Asian species, M. dschagastanica, is assigned to section Stenhammaria, but it is morphologically unusual and might constitute a third section of Mertensia. It has never been sampled for DNA.

Section Mertensia consists of all of the North American species plus M. rivularis, a denizen of the Russian half of the Beringian floristic region.

The North American species M. pilosa has been reported from Sakhalin and the Kuril Islands. It is the only species of Mertensia that is native to both Asia and North America. It resembles M. rivularis and might be closer to that species than to the other species of North America. It also resembles M. platyphylla and some authors have placed it in synonymy under Mertensia platyphylla variety platyphylla. It has not yet been sampled in a molecular phylogenetic study.

With the possible exception of M. pilosa, North American Mertensia is a monophyletic group consisting of three clades that are known informally as the Pacific Northwest clade, the Southern Rocky Mountain clade, and the Central Rocky Mountain clade. These groups are named for the region where most of their species occur, but each includes species from well outside of that region.

History 
In 1753, in his landmark Species Plantarum, Swedish botanist Carl Linnaeus placed five species in the genus Pulmonaria. Albrecht Wilhelm Roth, in 1797, separated what are now M. virginica, M. maritima, and M. sibirica from Pulmonaria to form the genus Mertensia, based on their smaller and differently structured calyx, their different anther position, and the presence of nectar glands on the inner surface of the corolla. Roth described one species as Mertensia pulmonarioides, apparently unaware that Linnaeus had already described it as Pulmonaria virginica. He thus created a superfluous synonym that has been a source of confusion ever since.

Mertensia was named after the German botanist, Franz Carl Mertens.

In the time since Mertensia was erected in 1797, it has been the subject of six major revisions. These, in chronological order, were done by George Don (George Don, the younger (G. Don), not George Don, the elder (Don)), Asa Gray, James Francis Macbride, Per Axel Rydberg, Louis Otho Williams, and Mikhail Grigorevich Popov.

Asa Gray divided Mertensia into two sections: Stenhammaria and Mertensia. The section Stenhammaria was named for the Swedish naturalist and clergyman Christian Stenhammar, who is best known for his work in lichenology. Gray defined the section Stenhammaria as consisting only of the littoral species M. maritima, but in 2014, it was expanded to comprise 12 species.

In 1886, Asa Gray described seven species in Mertensia. After Gray completed his monograph of Mertensia, many species were discovered by botanical expeditions in the western United States. Many of the species recognized by Macbride and Rydberg were later placed in synonymy by Louis O. Williams in his treatment of North American Mertensia in which he accepted only 24 species, far fewer than Macbride and Rydberg. M. pilosa was not mentioned anywhere in the monograph by Williams, not even as a synonym. Popov (1953) recognized the same 24 North American species as Williams as well as 14 species from Asia, including M. pilosa. Phylogenetic analysis of DNA data has shown that many of the species are polyphyletic, but no comprehensive revision of the Asian or of the North American species has been attempted since 1953.

In 1967, one of the sections delineated by Popov was raised to the rank of genus as Pseudomertensia. This reclassification has been confirmed by molecular phylogenies which place Pseudomertensia closer to Myosotis than any of the genera that have been sampled so far.

Evolution 
In the earlier infrageneric classifications of Mertensia, some of the groups were based on shared "primitive" characters rather than the derived character states that show true phylogenetic relationships. In Mertensia, as elsewhere, such groups have often proved to be paraphyletic. More recently, molecular phylogenetics has greatly clarified the ancestral and derived character states in Mertensia. Some of the traits evolving later have appeared independently as many as seven times.

Ancestral states in Mertensia include short plant height (< 40 cm), long stamens (> 1.5 mm), filaments inserted higher in the corolla, calyces divided at least 2⁄3 of the way to the base, and acute to acuminate calyx lobe apices. Their derived alternatives are greater plant height (> 40 cm), short stamens (< 1.5 mm), filaments attached lower in the corolla, and calyces divided less than halfway to the base, and obtuse calyx lobe apices.

The nutlets and pollen of Mertensia are nearly uniform and consequently, are not of much taxonomic value.

There are no known fossils of Mertensia. A molecular clock analysis has estimated that Mertensia diverged from Asperugo in the late Oligocene or early Miocene. Asperugo and Mertensia do not closely resemble each other morphologically. Being mostly plants of subarctic climates, Mertensia spread southward and to lower elevation during periods of Pleistocene glaciation, then retreated northward and to higher elevation during interglacials. Mertensia originated in Asia and dispersed over the Beringian land bridge to North America. Most of the groups that originated in Asia are more diverse there, but Mertensia is a conspicuous exception in having most of its species in North America.

Gallery

References

External links
 Mabberley's Plant-book
 Mertensia (Search) And Mertensia (Search Exact) At: Names At: Tropicos At: Science and Conservation At: Missouri Botanical Garden
 Mertensia  Plant Names  IPNI
 Mertensia  Index Nominum Genericorum  References  NMNH Department of Botany  Research and Collections  Smithsonian National Museum of Natural History
 page 34  page 35  Catalecta Botanica  HathiTrust
 CRC World Dictionary of Plant Names: M-Q At: Botany & Plant Science At: Life Science At: CRC Press
  BHL (Biodiversity Heritage Library):
 page 135  page 136  Species Plantarum, 1st ed. (1753) At: View Record of title 25 At: Titles by Carl von Linné (1707-1778)  Authors  BHL
Nomenclature of the Virginia bluebell  Volume 21, View Book  SIDA, contributions to botany  BHL
 page 318  page 372  volume 4  A general history of the dichlamydeous plants  Don, George, 1798-1856  authors  BHL
 page 179  page 199  volume 2, part 1  View Book  Synoptical flora of North America:  Gray, Asa, 1810-1888  authors  BHL
 Louis Otho Williams 1937  volume 24  Annals of the Missouri Botanical Garden  titles  BHL
 Asa Gray 1874  volume 10 (New Series volume 2)  Proceedings of the American Academy of Arts and Sciences  titles  BHL
 James Francis Macbride 1916
 Per Axel Rydberg 1922  Internet Archive
 Mertensia At: Species Records for Mertensia At: Mertensia At: List of genera At: Boraginaceae At: List of families At: Families and Genera in GRIN At: Queries At: GRIN taxonomy for plants
 Mertensia  Boraginaceae  Boraginales  lamiids  asterids  Embryophyta  Streptophytina  Streptophyta  Viridiplantae  Eukaryota  Taxonomy  UniProt
 Mertensia  Boraginaceae  Boraginales  lamiids  asterids  Embryophyta  Streptophytina  Streptophyta  Viridiplantae  Eukaryota  Taxonomy Browser  Taxonomy Database  Taxonomy  NCBI (National Center for Biotechnology Information)
 Display Results  Hierarchical Report with Plantae and Genus selected  Data Access  ITIS
 Mertensia  Boraginaceae  Boraginales  Magnoliopsida  Tracheophyta  Plants  Global Species
 Mertensia  Boraginaceae  Angiosperms  Browse  The Plant List
 Mertensia  Table of families and genera  Jepson eFlora
 USDA Plants Profile
 
 

 
Boraginaceae genera
Flora of North America